The 1995 Men's European Water Polo Championship was the 22nd edition of the bi-annual event, organised by the Europe's governing body in aquatics, the Ligue Européenne de Natation. The event took place in Vienna, Austria from August 18 to August 27, 1995, as an integrated part of the European LC Championships 1995.

Teams

Group A
 
 

Group B
 

 

Group C
 
 

Group D

First round

Group A

Group B

Group C

Group D

Second round

Group E

Group F

Group G

Semifinals

Finals
August 26, 1995 — Seventh place

August 26, 1995 — Fifth place

August 27, 1995 — Bronze Medal

August 27, 1995 — Gold Medal

Final ranking

Individual awards
Most Valuable Player
???
Best Goalkeeper
???
Topscorer
???

References
 Zwemkroniek (September, 1995)
 Coniliguria

Men
Men's European Water Polo Championship
International water polo competitions hosted by Austria
European Championship
Water polo